Donna M. Huryn is an American medicinal and organic chemist.  She received her B.A. (Chemistry) from Cornell University, and Ph.D. in Organic Chemistry from the University of Pennsylvania. She is on the faculty at the University of Pittsburgh’s School of Pharmacy, holds an adjunct appointment in the Department of Chemistry at the University of Pennsylvania, is the principal investigator of the University of Pittsburgh Chemical Diversity Center, and was a visiting fellow in the summer of 2017 at the University of Bologna. She is a fellow of the American Chemical Society, recipient of the ACS Philadelphia Local Section Award, has held a number of elected positions within the American Chemical Society at both the local and national levels, and is 2015 Chair of the Division of Organic Chemistry.  She is associate editor of ACS Medicinal Chemistry Letters. She in also an editor of the journal Organic Reactions and co-authored the textbook Medicinal Chemistry and the article "Medicinal Chemistry: Where Are All the Women?" which appeared in the ACS Medicinal Chemistry Letters Journal. Huryn’s research focuses on the design and synthesis of small molecules probes and drugs to treat cancer, neurodegenerative and infectious diseases.

References

Year of birth missing (living people)
Living people
University of Pennsylvania alumni
University of Pennsylvania faculty
Fellows of the American Chemical Society
Cornell University alumni
Organic chemists
American women chemists
Academic journal editors
University of Pittsburgh faculty
21st-century American chemists
21st-century American women scientists
American women academics